is a Japanese video game artist. She is best known for her work with Square (now Square Enix), in particular with the Final Fantasy series.

Biography 
Shibuya was born in 1965. While in middle school, she began creating illustrations and animations inspired by anime series including Space Battleship Yamato and Galaxy Express 999. As a high schooler she enrolled in a technical school to study animation and worked part-time for animation studios on popular anime including Transformers, Area 88, and Obake no Q-taro. In 1986, as she was losing interest in animation work, she was recruited by video game company Square.

Shibuya's first work for Square was providing illustrations for Alpha game manual and graphics for several games in development. In 1987, prompted by the success of Enix's Dragon Quest the previous year, Square released Final Fantasy. Shibuya created graphics including characters, spells, monsters, fonts, menus, and the game's opening bridge scene. By Final Fantasy II, she was one of two designers creating all the pixel art for the game.

Shibuya went on to design graphics for other Final Fantasy games, most notably the iconic chibi versions of characters, monsters, fonts, and menus. She was the primary pixel artist for many well-known games including entries in the SaGa series and Mana series (of which she created all the graphics for the first game).

In 2019, during a lecture at Japan Expo Paris, Shibuya was invited by Women in Games to be a member of honour.

Notable works 
 Alpha (manual illustration)
 King's Knight (graphics)
 Suishou no Ryuu (graphics)
 Rad Racer (graphics)
 The 3D Battles of WorldRunner (graphics)
 Final Fantasy (graphics including opening scene and user interface)
 Final Fantasy II (graphics and user interface)
 Final Fantasy III (graphics)
 Final Fantasy Adventure (graphics)
 Final Fantasy IV (package design)
 Final Fantasy V (chibi character graphics, package design, opening and closing scenes)
 Final Fantasy VI (chibi character graphics)
 Final Fantasy Dimensions (2D dot design)
 Final Fantasy IX (sub character graphics)
 Romancing SaGa (chibi character graphics)
 Romancing SaGa 3 (chibi character graphics)
 SaGa Frontier (chibi character graphics)
 SaGa Frontier 2 (chibi character graphics)
 Blue Wing Blitz (graphics director)
 Final Fantasy Crystal Chronicles (menu graphics and user interface)
 Code Age Commanders (menu design)
 Final Fantasy IV: The After Years (chibi character graphics)
 Final Fantasy Dimensions II (chief designer, chibi character graphics, menu design)
 Dragon Quest Monsters (monster and background graphics)
 Nanashi no Game (character graphics)
 Yosumin! (design director)
 Terra Battle (monster graphics)
 Adventures of Mana (Original staff, graphics)
 Final Fantasy: Brave Exvius (character supervisor and designer of Katy Perry’s character)
 Season of Mystery: The Cherry Blossom Murders (art director)

See also

References 

Anime character designers
Final Fantasy designers
Square Enix people
Japanese women illustrators
Living people
Video game artists
1965 births